Francis Hemmingson (5 September 1912 – 7 April 1963) was a New Zealand cricketer. He played eleven first-class matches for Auckland between 1945 and 1950.

See also
 List of Auckland representative cricketers

References

External links
 

1912 births
1963 deaths
New Zealand cricketers
Auckland cricketers
Cricketers from Auckland